Artena inversa is a species of moth of the family Erebidae. It is found on Borneo, north-eastern Sumatra and in the Philippines and Peninsular Malaysia.

External links
 Species info

Catocalinae
Moths described in 1858
Moths of Asia